Metanol (English: Methanol) is a 2018 Czech movie. The movie is divided into 2 parts. The film focuses on the 2012 Czech Republic methanol poisonings. First part premiered on 22 April 2018. It was viewed by 1,350,000 people. Second part premiered on 29 April 2018. It was viewed by 1,225,000 people. The film was viewed by another 500,000 people on Česká televize internet portal.

Cast
Lukáš Vaculík as Jiří Milota
David Máj as Rudolf Fulín
Tomáš Bambušek as Tomáš Sikora
Kristýna Podzimková as Iveta Ožanová
Dušan Sitek as Josef Gawlas
Veronika Freimanová as Jaroslava Gawlasová
Martin Finger as Captain Tomáš Zakopal
Vasil Fridrich as Captain Marek Hálek
Roman Zach as Roman Chalaš
Vladimír Kratina as Karel Chmiela
Marta Falvey Sovová as Alena Fulínová
Jiří Kout as Prosecutor Marek Straka
Ondřej Nosálek as Prosecutor Pavel Nebeský
Jiří Hána as Analyst Hána
Petr Halíček as Analys Trachta
Lívia Bielovič Sabol as Světlana Sikorová
Alena Doláková as Marie Podleská
Lukáš Melnik as Martin Frýda

Reception
The film has received generally positive reviews from critics. It holds 73% at Kinobox.

References

External links
 
 Official website
 Metanol on Eurochannel

2018 television films
2010s Czech-language films
Czech crime films
Czech television films
Czech Television original films
2018 films
Films released in separate parts